In late 2008, the Department of Defense published a list of the Guantanamo captives who died in custody, were freed, or were repatriated to the custody of another country.
The list was drafted on October 8, 2008, and was published on November 26, 2008.
Subsequently almost two hundred more captives have been released or transferred, and several more have died in custody.

Consolidated list of October 2008

Changes since October 2008

Countries that have accepted non-citizen detainees
These are countries that have accepted the transfer of former Guantanamo detainees who are not their own citizens.

References

Guantanamo Bay detention camp
.
Release And Transfer